Albury Library Museum is a combined library and museum in Albury, New South Wales, Australia. Designed by Ashton Raggatt McDougall it was opened in 2007. In the first year of its operation the building had 226,000 visitors, of which 80,000 entered the exhibition space. The library has 50,000 books, magazines and electronic media items, and received 80,000 visitors in the first year of its operation, a 50% increase compared to the previous year. The building received the Australian Institute of Architects's National Award for Public Architecture.

Brief review

The library museum renders an architectural texture to the cityscape of Albury. Less than eight years old, the builders of the building in a dazzling orange and grey finish with a criss-cross architecture, is said to have been motivated by the historic Murray River rail bridge. The library impresses with facilities that meet the latest technology, free access to computer and free wifi. The center showcases  Albury's rich culture and heritage and organizes interactive exhibitions, also furnishing the visitors with ample of reading and research materials.

For those interested in history, the Crossing Place: A Story of Albury, helps to get an insight into the history of the city from the Wiradjuri, the Australian aborigines and the right owners of the land, the post-war European migration to the present-day big city.

References

External links

Official website

Albury, New South Wales
Libraries in New South Wales
Museums in New South Wales
History museums in Australia
Buildings and structures completed in 2007
Library buildings completed in 2007
Libraries established in 2007
2007 establishments in Australia